The Belarus Sailing Union is the national governing body for the sport of sailing in Belarus, recognised by the International Sailing Federation.

Notable sailors
See :Category:Belarusian sailors

Olympic sailing
See :Category:Olympic sailors of Belarus

References

External links
 Official website

Belarus
Sailing
Sailing
Sports organizations established in 1963
1963 establishments in Belarus